New Boston is an unincorporated community and census-designated place (CDP) in Schuylkill County, Pennsylvania, United States. It was first listed as a CDP prior to the 2020 census. Before that, it was part of the New Boston-Morea CDP.

New Boston is in northern Schuylkill County, in the south part of Mahanoy Township.

Interstate 81 passes south of New Boston, with access from exits near Frackville and Mahanoy City.

Demographics

References 

Census-designated places in Schuylkill County, Pennsylvania
Census-designated places in Pennsylvania